Tuluá, is a city located in the heart of Valle del Cauca, Colombia. A major industrial and commercial center, it is the region's fourth-largest city after Cali—the department capital—Palmira and Buenaventura. Founded around 1741 by Juan de Lemos y Aguirre, it has a population of approximately 178,000. It is also known as the Corazón del Valle (meaning 'The Heart of Valle'), as La Villa de Céspedes ('Town of Céspedes', named after the naturalist Juan María Céspedes) and Tierra Fácil ('Easy Land' in the native language).

It is well known throughout Colombia and many parts of South America as a major center of salsa dancing.

Geography

The Tuluá River runs through Tuluá's urban area. The city is located 269 miles from Bogotá, the capital of Colombia, 63 miles northeast of Cali and 108 miles from the important harbor city of Buenaventura, which lies on the coast of the Pacific Ocean. Although it has a relatively small urban area, Tuluá's metropolitan area is comparatively big. The city lies between the two westernmost cordilleras of Colombia, about 50 miles east of Buenaventura.

Climate
Located just three degrees north of the equator, Tuluá has a tropical rainforest climate (Af in the Köppen climate classification). It has hot, sunny days usually in the high 20s and low 30s, punctuated by intense storms. Night temperatures are on average in the high teens. A lot of different vegetables and fruit are grown in Tuluá.

Crime

Tuluá has high crime rates. The surge in murders is allegedly due to rivaling paramilitary gangs Los Urabeños and Los Rastrojos fighting for control of the city's lucrative drug trade. In 2022, over 50 people were killed by a prison riot.

Education
The University of Valle has a branch campus in Tuluá. The main campus is based in Cali, the department's capital. UCEVA (the Central University of Valle del Cauca) has its main campus in the city.

Transportation
The closest airport is Cali's international airport—which in fact is in Palmira—Alfonso Bonilla Aragón International Airport (CLO) or Palmaseca. Nine airlines provide service for the airport, including American Airlines, AeroRepública and Avianca, Colombia's largest airline. Tuluá also has a regional airport, Heriberto Gíl Martínez Airport (ULQ).

Places of interest
Botanical garden (Jardin Botánico) called Juan María Céspedes in Mateguadua village. Chillicote lake is famous for its herons. The soccer stadium 12 de Octubre has a capacity of 17,000. It is used by the local soccer team Cortuluá, which plays in the Colombian first division.

Guadua Park (Parque de la Guadua) Bamboo and heliconias (plants often mistaken for birds-of-paradise), nature trails , a waterfall, and natural pools of warm water are some of the attractions at the Guillermo Ponce de León Paris Guadua Park in Tuluá. This 12.5-acre site is overflowing with greenery; visitors can also enjoy a large playground with their children. Sarmiento Lora Park (Parque Sarmiento Lora) It offers a great kiddie pool (complete with little water slides) and adult pool area, restaurant, shelters and play area. Civic Plaza Boyaca (Plaza Civica Boyaca)

The Tuluá Festival (Feria de Tuluá) takes place every June in the second or third week. Music plays an important role with bands, artists and singers performing. A music performance is held every night.

Notable people
Faustino Hernán Asprilla, football player
Gustavo Álvarez Gardeazábal, writer
Poncho Rentería, journalist
Diego Salazar, Olympic weightlifting medal winner
Carlos Alzate, cyclist
Jonathan Cuenú, football player

References

External links

Major's official website: 
Estación de radio virtual online www.futturo.org e-Radio desde Tuluá Colombia
Entertainment website (Iosfera): 
Entertainment website (Mastulua): 
Tulua's Fair official website: 
Information website about Tulua's Fair on Iosfera: 
Information website about Tulua's (News, Events, Photos) on Iosfera: 
Information website about Tulua's (News) on Revista independiente: 
Information website about Tulua's Fair on Mastulua: 
Information website about Cortuluá: 

Municipalities of Valle del Cauca Department
Populated places established in 1741